Blaine Lacher (born September 5, 1970) is a Canadian former professional ice hockey goaltender. Lacher played for the Boston Bruins of the National Hockey League in the mid-1990s.

Lacher was a standout goaltender at Lake Superior State University in college, leading his team to a national championship in 1994.  In his final season at Lake Superior State, Lacher led the nation in both save percentage (SV%) and goals against average (GAA) at .918 and 1.98, respectively. He set an NCAA Division 1 shutout record of 375:01, which still stands as of 2017.  Lacher gave up his final year of eligibility to sign as a free agent with the Boston Bruins.

Lacher started his professional career with the Bruins very well, losing only one of his starts down the stretch to get the team into the 1995 NHL Playoffs, where they lost to the eventual Stanley Cup champions, the New Jersey Devils.  Lacher had a spectacular season in 1994–95, making 35 appearances.  His record in those games was 19–11–2 with a 2.41 goals against average (GAA), a .902 save percentage (SV%), and four shutouts.

After being promoted to the full-time starting goaltender the next season, Lacher's earlier performances did not keep up and his statistics suffered.  He was part of a rotation of goaltenders in the 1995–96 season, which ended with Craig Billington signing onto the Bruins and when the Bruins traded for one-time Bruins prospect Bill Ranford from the Edmonton Oilers.  Lacher played for several teams during the 1995–1996 season, playing for the Cleveland Lumberjacks of the IHL, and the Bruins' minor-league affiliate, the Providence Bruins.  Even in Providence, Lacher's record was hardly up to his numbers from the previous season.  With Boston, Lacher's record was 3–5–2 with a poor 3.93 GAA and .845 SV%.  Lacher did not return with the Bruins after that season.

Lacher retired from professional hockey after another disastrous season in the IHL with the Grand Rapids Griffins.  In 11 games with the Griffins, Lacher was 1–8–1 with a 3.76 GAA and a .877 SV%.

Career statistics

Regular season and playoffs

Awards and honours

References

External links
 

1970 births
Living people
Boston Bruins players
Canadian ice hockey goaltenders
Cleveland Lumberjacks players
Grand Rapids Griffins (IHL) players
Ice hockey people from Alberta
Lake Superior State Lakers men's ice hockey players
Melville Millionaires players
NCAA men's ice hockey national champions
Providence Bruins players
Sportspeople from Medicine Hat
Undrafted National Hockey League players